This is a list of submissions to the 95th Academy Awards for the Best International Feature Film. The Academy of Motion Picture Arts and Sciences (AMPAS) has invited the film industries of various countries to submit their best film for the Academy Award for Best International Feature Film every year since the award was created in 1956. The award is presented annually by the Academy to a feature-length motion picture produced outside the United States that contains primarily non-English dialogue. The International Feature Film Award Committee oversees the process and reviews all the submitted films. The category was previously called the Best Foreign Language Film, but this was changed in April 2019 to Best International Feature Film, after the Academy deemed the word "Foreign" to be outdated.

For the 95th Academy Awards, the submitted motion pictures must be first released theatrically in their respective countries between 1 January 2022 and 30 November 2022. The deadline for submissions to the Academy was 3 October 2022, and 93 countries submitted a film. Uganda submitted a film for the first time, and Tanzania made a submission for the first time since 2001.

After the 15-film shortlist was announced on December 21, 2022, the five nominees were announced on January 24, 2023. All Quiet on the Western Front by Edward Berger won the award for Germany.

Submissions

Notes
  Bulgaria originally announced Mother by Zornitsa Sophia as their submission in September 2022. After asking the Academy of Motion Picture Arts and Sciences to confirm the film's eligibility, it was rejected for having more than 50% of its dialogue in English. Later the same month, they submitted a second film, In the Heart of the Machine.
  Egypt's Oscar Selection Committee announced a shortlist of five films: The Crime by Sherif Arafa, Full Moon by Hadi El Bagoury, Kira & El Gin by Marwan Hamed, 2 Talaat Harb by Magdy Ahmed Ali and Villa 19-B by Ahmad Abdalla., although Ahmed Ali withdrew his film prior to the vote. On 29 September, it was announced that a majority of the committee voted not to send any film and that Egypt would be absent for the first time since 2015; Kira & El Gin obtained the highest number of votes of those who voted for sending a film, however, it was lower than those who selected against sending any submission.  Mohamed Hefzy explained, "The committee that made the decision included more than 30 filmmakers, and it is clear that the films presented to them did not live up to their expectations to be nominated for the Oscars."
  Malta's submission was originally reported to be Carmen directed by Valerie Buhagiar. However, it was not included on any of the assignment lists sent to Academy members who volunteered to participate in that first round of voting.
  Nigeria's Oscar Selection Committee (NOSC) announced they received three Yoruba-language submissions: Aníkúlápó by Kunle Afolayan, Elesin Oba, The King's Horseman by Biyi Bandele and King of Thieves by Tope Adebayo and Adebayo Tijani. They announced they would not enter because a majority of the committee voted that "no film is eligible"; eight out of the fifteen members considered all the three films as “non-eligible” for submission for Oscar considerations, meanwhile, five voted in favour of Elesin Oba: The King’s Horseman and one voted for each of the remaining two options. Chairperson Chineze Anyaene-Abonyi urged Nigerian filmmakers to become better acquainted with previous Oscar-nominated films in the category "to achieve the needed international recognition and put our films in its acclaimed level of creative discourse." The decision to not select a film sparked criticism and complaints about NOSC processes, leading the Academy's International Feature Film Executive Committee to grant the NOSC an extension until 21 October 2022 to revote and submit a film. The majority of the committee again chose not to send a film, and several committee members resigned in protest.
  Russia's Oscar Committee, headed by Pavel Chukhray, confirmed its intention to submit a film on 23 September 2022. However, on 26 September, the Russian Film Academy announced they would not enter. On 27 September, Chukhray resigned in protest and said he was not consulted about the decision. Nikita Mikhalkov, alluding to the United States' reaction to the 2022 Russian invasion of Ukraine, had previously said, "The way I see it, choosing a film that will represent Russia in a country that, in fact, now denies the existence of Russia, is simply pointless."
  Zambia formed an approved Oscar Selection Committee for the first time. Zambia's Oscar Committee invited filmmakers to submit their films for consideration by 16 September 2022. Their submission was scheduled to be announced on 26 September. This would have been the country's first time competing for the award.
 The Oscar Selection Committees for Ghana, Malaysia and South Africa invited filmmakers to make submissions, but did not end up sending films. South Africa was absent from the competition for the first time since 2007.

References

External links
 Official list of films eligible for consideration in the International Feature Film Category, 95th Academy Awards

2022 in film
95